The 1988 Orlando mayoral election was held on September 6, 1988 to elect the mayor of Orlando, Florida. It saw the reelection of Bill Frederick.

Municipal elections in Orlando and Orange County are non-partisan.

Results

References

1988
1988 Florida elections
1988 United States mayoral elections
1980s in Orlando, Florida